The Volkswagen Transporter T6 is the sixth generation of the Volkswagen Transporter vans. It is the successor to the T5 Transporter. The Transporter line is the mid-size van offered by Volkswagen Commercial Vehicles, between the larger Crafter and smaller Caddy.

Overview

Still based on the T5's 7H / 7J platform, the T6 came with a wide range of revisions and updates, including a completely new dashboard layout (in two versions, standard and 'comfort'). The front end ahead of the windscreen was all new along with cosmetic revisions to the tailgate / rear doors and rear lights.

New options for the T6 included LED headlights, LED rear lights and a range of driver assistance and multimedia options.

Transporter T6.1 

Volkswagen unveiled the updated T6.1 version of the T6 at the Geneva Motor Show in March 2019.  Essentially a mid-cycle refresh, the main updates were electric power steering, which allows for the implementation of more driver assist functions compared to the T6.  There were also minor styling updates in the form of a deeper front grille section. The T6.1 also has a new dashboard incorporating updated infotainment systems similar to those used in VW's passenger car range, and the ability to specify the "Virtual Cockpit" fully digital instrument cluster first seen on the Golf and Passat.

ABT e-Transporter

VW collaborated with ABT e-Line and introduced the ABT e-Transporter 6.1 in 2020 as a battery-electric version of the T6.1.

Successors
The T6.1 Caravelle and Multivan were replaced by the Multivan (T7) in 2022; the T7 is based on the MQB platform and includes options for hybrid powertrains. In addition, the Multivan T7 is expected to displace the Touran and Sharan. Transporter commercial body styles will continue on the T6 platform.

Powertrain
At launch, the engine range closely matched the previous generation T5 (2010 – 2016), but these were soon updated to newer, cleaner engines including new  TDi and  BiTDi diesels. All engines became Euro6 emissions compliant.

Towards the end of 2017, a new (to the Transporter) 2.0 TFSi engine became available, mirroring the motor industry's gradual move away from diesel engines.

5 and 6 speed manual gearboxes from the previous generation were carried over, as was the 7 speed DSG gearbox.

4motion four wheel drive continued to be an option, becoming standard fitment with the  BiTDi engine as of 2018.

Models
The Transporter T6 is offered in a variety of body styles, including as a panel van, motorhome ("California"), passenger ("Caravelle"/"Multivan" and "Shuttle"/"Window van"), combination cargo and passenger ("Kombi"), and chassis cab for a custom body or cargo bed. In addition, the T6 is available with either short- or long-wheelbase and either low, medium, or high roof; the high roof is only available in combination with the long-wheelbase.

Cargo: Panel van and Kombi
There were three trim levels available: Startline (base), Trendline (mid), and Highline (luxurious). The Kombi model (in some markets, "Crewvan") added a second row of three seats along with windows for the second row.

Passenger: Caravelle, Multivan, and Shuttle
The Caravelle T6 is equipped with seven seats in three rows, windows all around, and leather seating surfaces; it is designed for luxurious passenger transport. It is available with either the short- or long-wheelbase and the standard-height roof. The second row includes two individual, swiveling seats and the third-row accommodates three, forward-facing. At its introduction, the Caravelle was available with a single color option, a two-tone red-and-white finish.

In Australia, the three-row Caravelle was branded as the Multivan, available with short- or long-wheelbase and seven seats. The Australian Caravelle was available in the long-wheelbase form only, and the interior was fitted with nine seats in four rows.

Like the Caravelle, the Shuttle T6 is equipped with windows at all three rows for passenger transport, but is intended for commercial for-hire services, and correspondingly is fitted with up to nine seats and hard-wearing surfaces. The standard seating accommodates eight in three rows, but the vehicle was available with just two seats in the front (as the "Transporter window van") if desired.

Chassis cab 
The chassis cab model is available with either a single (one row of seats) or double (two rows) cab, in the long-wheelbase form only. Overall length is the same for both models; the loading platform is shortened on the double cab model accordingly.

Campervans 
As with previous generations of the Transporter, the T6 is a popular platform to be converted into a campervan. T6 conversions commonly include a pop top roof to create extra headroom. The conversion can also include a bed platform, hob, sink and grill installation, along with additional storage. 

Volkswagen also offers a factory made campervan called the California.

Notes

References 

Transporter (T6)
Vans
Minibuses
Police vehicles
Euro NCAP large MPVs
Cars powered by VR engines
Front-wheel-drive vehicles
All-wheel-drive vehicles
Vehicles introduced in 2015
2010s cars